This is a list of South Africa Men's Twenty20 International cricketers. The list is arranged in the order in which each player won his first Twenty20 cap. Where more than one player won his first Twenty20 cap in the same match, those players are listed alphabetically by surname.

Key

Players
Statistics are correct as of 6 November 2022.

Captains

Notes

See also
Twenty20 International
South Africa national cricket team
List of South Africa national cricket captains
List of South Africa Test cricketers
List of South Africa ODI cricketers

References

South African Twenty20
Twenty20 International cricketers